This list of the most commonly challenged books in the United States refers to books sought to be removed or otherwise restricted from public access, typically from a library or a school curriculum. This list is primarily based on U.S. data gathered by the American Library Association's Office for Intellectual Freedom (OIF), which gathers data from media reports, and from reports from librarians and teachers.

As of 2020, the top ten reasons books were challenged and banned books included sexual content (92.5% percent of books on the list); offensive language (61.5%); unsuited to age group (49%); religious viewpoint (26%); LGBTQIA+ content (23.5%); violence (19%); racism (16.5%); drugs, alcohol, and smoking (12.5%); "anti-family" content (7%); and political viewpoint (6.5%).

List 
Since 2001, the American Library Association has posed the top ten most frequently challenged books per year on their website. Using the Radcliffe Publishing Course Top 100 Novels of the 20th Century, ALA has also noted banned and challenged classics.

The list is sorted alphabetically by default. Included is each book's rank in the ALA's lists of top 100 challenged books by decade (if applicable).

Note: The ALA Office for Intellectual Freedom (OIF) does not claim comprehensiveness in recording challenges. Research suggests that for each challenge reported there are as many as four or five which go unreported.

See also 
 2020–22 book banning in the United States
 List of books banned by governments

References

External links 
 Banned & Challenged Books at the American Library Association website

Book censorship in the United States
Lists of controversial books
Books